Madison station is a former train station in Madison, Florida. It was served by Amtrak's Sunset Limited, the national railroad passenger system. Service has been suspended since Hurricane Katrina struck the Gulf Coast in 2005. Madison station is unique in that its waiting area consists of gazebos.

References

External links

Madison Amtrak Station (USA Rail Guide -- Train Web)

Former Amtrak stations in Florida
Railway stations closed in 2005
1993 establishments in Florida
2005 disestablishments in Florida
Railway stations in the United States opened in 1993